The Commander of the Royal Canadian Navy (French: Commandant de la Marine royale canadienne) is the institutional head of the Royal Canadian Navy.  This appointment also includes the title Chief of the Naval Staff and is based at National Defence Headquarters in Ottawa, Ontario. This individual reports to the Chief of the Defence Staff, who then responds to the Commander-in-Chief of the Canadian Armed Forces.

History of the position
The appointment was entitled Director of the Naval Service from 1910 to 1928 and then Chief of the Naval Staff from 1928 to 1964. In August 1964 the position of Chief of the Naval Staff was abolished.  Responsibility for naval matters was split between the newly established Defence Staff in Ottawa and operational headquarters in Halifax (for Flag Officer Atlantic Coast) and Esquimalt (for Flag Officer Pacific Coast). The appointment was entitled Commander of Maritime Command from 1966 to 1997 and Chief of the Maritime Staff from 1997 to 2011.  In 2011 Maritime Command was renamed the Royal Canadian Navy at which time the appointment was renamed to its present incarnation.

Appointees
The following table lists all those who have held the post of Commander of the Royal Canadian Navy or its preceding positions. Ranks and honours are as at the completion of their tenure:

|-style="text-align:center;"
!colspan=6|Director of the Naval Service

|-style="text-align:center;"
!colspan=6|Chief of the Naval Staff

|-style="text-align:center;"
!colspan=6|Principal Naval Adviser

|-style="text-align:center;"
!colspan=6|Commander of Maritime Command

|-style="text-align:center;"
!colspan=6|Chief of the Maritime Staff

|-style="text-align:center;"
!colspan=6|Chief of the Naval Staff and Commander of the Royal Canadian Navy

See also
 Chief of the Defence Staff, the second most senior member of the Canadian Forces after the Commander-in-Chief
 Commander of the Canadian Army, the institutional head of the Canadian Army.
 Commander of the Royal Canadian Air Force, the institutional head of the Royal Canadian Air Force.

Notes

References

Military appointments of Canada
Commanders of the Royal Canadian Navy
Canada